The 43rd Bodil Awards was a historical event as the Danish drama Dansen med Regitze, also known as Memories of a Marriage, directed by Kaspar Rostrup, took all the Danish film related awards available in 1990.

Only two additional awards were given to two foreign films A Short Film About Killing by Krzysztof Kieślowski and Dangerous Liaisons by Stephen Frears.

Winners and nominees

Best Actor in a Leading Role 
Frits Helmuth – Dansen med Regitze

Best Actress in a Leading Role 
Ghita Nørby – Dansen med Regitze

Best Actor in a Supporting Role 
Henning Moritzen – Dansen med Regitze

Best Actress in a Supporting Role 
Kirsten Rolffes –  Dansen med Regitze

Best European Film 
A Short Film About Killing

Best non-European Film 
Dangerous Liaisons

References 

1989 film awards
1990 in Denmark
Bodil Awards ceremonies
1990s in Copenhagen
March 1990 events in Europe